Teague Creek is a stream in Webster County in the Ozarks of southern Missouri. It is a tributary of the James River.

Teague Creek has the name of the local Teague family who settled in the area around 1845.

See also
List of rivers of Missouri

References

Rivers of Webster County, Missouri
Rivers of Missouri